Kakhi is a masculine Georgian name and nickname. Notable people with this name include:

 Kakhi Asatiani (1947–2002), Georgian association footballer and manager
 Kakhi Gogichaishvili (Kakhaber Gogichaishvili, born 1968), Georgian footballer
 Kakhi Kakhiashvili (born 1969).Georgian-Greek weightlifter
 Kakhi Kaladze (Kakhaber Kaladze, born 1978), Georgian politician and footballer
 Kakhi Kavsadze (1935–2021), Georgian and Soviet actor
 Kakhi Makharadze (born 1987), Georgian footballer

Georgian masculine given names